Bowshaw is an area in Derbyshire, England, that now forms part of the town of Dronfield. There is little for the casual visitor to see except a long row of 20th-century houses alongside the road from Dronfield to Sheffield, although some notable buildings include Bowshaw House, built in the 1730s by the Lucas family, Bowshaw Farm (formed by a division of Bowshaw House by the Hatfield family c. 1940) and Bowshaw Inn.

Geography of Derbyshire
North East Derbyshire District